Discolocrinus thieli is a species of sea lily, a crinoid in the family Bathycrinidae. It is native to the eastern Pacific Ocean. It was described  by A. N. Mironov.  It is named in honor of deep sea ecologist Hjalmar Thiel.

Description
Discolocrinus thieli is described from fragments retrieved by the RV Sonne in 1992. It has a low, funnel shaped calyx. None of the arms were complete with the longest fragment being . It is attached to the substrate by an expanded terminal columnal with two short, flattened rootlets to reinforce the attachment.

Distribution

References 

Bourgueticrinida
Animals described in 2008